Talk was an American magazine published from 1999 to 2002. The magazine gained notoriety for its celebrity profiles and interviews. The magazine was a joint venture of Miramax's Talk Media and Hearst Magazines. Hearst would manage circulation, manufacturing, newsstand distribution and subscription fulfillment. Talk Media was in charge of advertising sales, editorial content and marketing.

History and profile
Talk Media was founded in July 1998 by Miramax Films, Tina Brown and Ron Galotti to publish books, the Talk magazine and to produce television programs. Talk Media formed a joint venture with Hearst Magazines for the magazine only in February 1999.

The first issue of Talk appeared in September 1999. The cover story of the debut issue was an interview with Hillary Clinton, which took place shortly after the Clinton–Lewinsky scandal, in which she explained that her husband Bill Clinton had a chronic need to please women. The Washington Post reported that at times, "Talk seemed more interested in promoting such Miramax stars as Gwyneth Paltrow than in politics."

The magazine never became a commercial success, and its publication was suspended after the final February 2002 issue. Politico estimated that Brown had "bombed through some $50 million in 2 1/2 years" on the failed venture. A $1 million contract settlement in 2002 ended Brown's involvement in Talk Media.

References

Celebrity magazines published in the United States
Defunct magazines published in the United States
Entertainment magazines published in the United States
Hearst Communications publications
Magazines established in 1999
Magazines disestablished in 2002
Miramax
Former subsidiaries of The Walt Disney Company
1999 establishments in the United States